Hexaspora is a monotypic genus of flowering plants belonging to the family Celastraceae. The only species is Hexaspora pubescens.

Its native range is Northeastern Australia.

References

Celastraceae
Celastrales genera
Monotypic rosid genera